Mansarbass is a village in Bhiwani district, Haryana, India.

Geography
It has an average elevation of 237 metres (830 feet).

Agriculture is the primary occupation for the residents of the village. Because of this, they are one of the major producers of grain and milk in the state.

References

Villages in Bhiwani district